Turley is an extinct town in Texas County, in the U.S. state of Missouri. The GNIS classifies it as a populated place. The community is located on Roubidoux Creek, approximately two miles downstream (northwest) of Roubidoux. The community of Plato is about 4.5 miles to the northwest.

A post office called Turley was established in 1886, and remained in operation until 1949. The community has the name of Turley Embree, the son of an early postmaster.

References

Ghost towns in Missouri
Former populated places in Texas County, Missouri